Bakkie may refer to:

 Pickup truck, a South African and Dutch informal term for a pickup truck
 Bakkie, Suriname, a resort and town in Suriname

See also
 Baki (disambiguation)